The York State Fair is a ten-day fair held in July/August in York, Pennsylvania. Formerly known as the York Fair and held in September, it was renamed and rescheduled for 2020, though canceled that year due to the COVID-19 pandemic. It is one of the oldest fairs in the country, tracing its roots to 1765.  Fair organizers reported a record attendance in 2012 of over 640,000. Over the last six decades, the fair has drawn a broad set of notable musicians and comedians, listed here by year of performance.

References

External links
 York Fair

York State Fair
York, Pennsylvania
Performers at the York State Fair